Fabrice Luamba Ngoma (born 22 January 1994) is a Congolese professional footballer who plays as a midfielder for Al-Hilal Club and the DR Congo national football team.

References

1994 births
Living people
Democratic Republic of the Congo footballers
Footballers from Kinshasa
Association football midfielders
Sharks XI FC players
FC MK Etanchéité players
Ifeanyi Ubah F.C. players
AS Vita Club players
Raja CA players
Democratic Republic of the Congo international footballers
Democratic Republic of the Congo expatriate footballers
Expatriate footballers in Nigeria
Democratic Republic of the Congo expatriate sportspeople in Nigeria
Expatriate footballers in Morocco
Democratic Republic of the Congo expatriate sportspeople in Morocco
Linafoot players
Nigeria Professional Football League players
Botola players
21st-century Democratic Republic of the Congo people